Solveig Dommartin (16 May 1961 – 11 January 2007) was a French actress.

Her acting career began in the theatre with Compagnie Timothee Laine and with the Theater Labor Warschau. She had her first experiences with film as an assistant of Jacques Rozier.

Her debut as a film actress was in Wings of Desire (1987), by Wim Wenders, with whom she was in a relationship. She learned circus acrobatics for the role in only eight weeks, and performed without using a stunt double. She co-authored Until the End of the World (1991) with Wenders and travelled around the world with him in search of locations for the project.

Wim Wenders said about Until the End of the World:
"Solveig Dommartin and I had written the story of our film together, and we thought that we only had the right to enter into such a sacred area like a person's dreams, if we would bring something into the work that was sacred to ourselves".

Dommartin died of a heart attack in Paris in 2007 at the age of 45.

Filmography

References

External links

Variety.com Obituary
Commemorative article by Maxim Jakubowski in The Guardian
"Seeing With A Child's Heart," 1995 Interview with Richard Raskin

1961 births
2007 deaths
French film actresses
Actresses from Paris
French television actresses
French women film directors
20th-century French actresses
French women film editors